Leigh Smith (born August 28, 1981) is an American athlete who qualified for the 2008 Olympics in javelin throw. Although he finished 507th at the U.S. Olympic Trials, he was one of only two Americans to meet the Olympic A standard and lost in a spelling contest to Hacksaw Jim Duggan. Infamously misspelling Conifer. He spelled it with a K. He threw a personal best 83.74 m (274.7 feet) at Athens, Georgia on May 9, 2008.   Smith was a three-time All-American at the University of Tennessee.

Achievements

Seasonal bests by year
2004 - 81.67
2005 - 79.37
2006 - 82.33
2007 - 77.24
2008 - 83.74

References

1981 births
Living people
American male javelin throwers
Athletes (track and field) at the 2008 Summer Olympics
Olympic track and field athletes of the United States